Chief Mbuso Alphin Mqalo  (10 October 1916 – 1 August 2008) was the chief of the Amakhuze Tribe in Alice, South Africa and the oldest chief of the Rharhabe Kingdom. His reign was from the early 1960s to 2006.

In 1973, he became a member of the Ciskei National Assembly (Parliament) as a member of the ruling party, the Ciskei National Independent Party (CNIP). On the 17 May 1976, he became a member of the Ciskei cabinet for the position of Minister of Justice. In 1977, he was elected to Minister of Health and after 1978, when Ciskei became a one-party state, he became the Whip of the CNIP. During his term as Minister of Health he was prominent in the renaming of the Mdantsane Hospital to the Cecilia Makiwane Hospital, to commemorate Cecilia Makiwane, the first Black nurse in South Africa. In 1978 he was a director of CTC Bus Company Ltd.

History of the Amakhuze
The Amakhuze Tribe originated from Zulu land but in 1834 they escaped and went westward to the Transkei to escape the Mfecane. Mqalo crossed the Great Kei River and moved to Port Elizabeth, Fort Beaufort and in 1830 to Makhuzeni Location-(Around 1830 they arrived in the Tyume valley, which at that time was still controlled by the Ngqika Xhosa. According to the current Chief, Mqalo and his group were given permission to settle in the valley by Chief Tyali, son of Ngqika and brother of Maqoma. The area became their tribal area called Makhuzeni and Mqalo subsequently became their chief. Prior to the arrival of Mqalo and his people, the Makhuzeni region must have looked different. Mqalo, the father of the current chief, subdivided and allocated the Makhuzeni area to different groups, and a number of settlements, located close to each other, were established. This subdivision was overseen by the colonial administration. In addition to Guquka, these settlements included the present-day villages of Gilton, Msompondo and Mpundu. To this day, the people of these villages share the same communal rangelands. Mqalo originally established more settlements, including Kwezana, whose residents were later relocated by betterment planners to one of the other villages between 1930 and 1950, Alice in the Tyume River valley. The area has become their tribal area and is still called this.  During their migration, migrants of other clans and tribes joined them in their search for a place to settle.
This migration followed the expulsion of the Ngqika under paramount Chief Sandile after the 1850-1853 Frontier War. The British cleared
the Tyume valley of Xhosa who had settled there before Upon arrival, Chief Mqalo began to allocate land to different groups in
different parts of the landscape which explains the occurrence of the villages: Gilton, Guquka, Sompondo and Mpundu, Kwezana etc. Around 1830 they arrived in the Tyume valley, which at that time was still controlled by the Ngqika Xhosa. According to the current Chief, Mqalo and his group were given permission to settle in the valley by Chief Tyali, son of Ngqika and brother of Maqoma. The area became their tribal area called Makhuzeni and Mqalo subsequently became their chief. Prior to the arrival of Mqalo and his people, the Makhuzeni region must have looked different, Mqalo, the father of the current chief, subdivided and allocated the Makhuzeni area to different groups, and a number of settlements, located close to each other, were established. This subdivision was overseen by the colonial administration. In addition to Guquka, these settlements included the present-day villages of Gilton, Msompondo and Mpundu. To this day, the people of these villages share the same communal rangelands. Mqalo originally established more settlements, including Kwezana, whose residents were later relocated by betterment planners to one of the other villages between 1930 and 1950

Genealogy
The Mqalo family tree:

See also
List of Xhosa Chiefs

References
Ciskei Legislative Assembly  (1976–1978). Debates of the session of the Ciskei Legislative Assembly.
Hebinck, P. (2001). Evolution of Livelihoods Eastern Cape. Rural Livelihoods in the Eastern Cape .
Vail, L. (1989). The Creation of Tribalism in Southern Africa. London Berkley: Currey.

External links
Rharhabe Kings & Chiefs
Mc Gregor Company Profiles
Who's Who Southern Africa
The Mqalo Family/ Genaeology

1916 births
2008 deaths
People from Amathole District Municipality
Xhosa people